Euterpe edulis, commonly known as juçara, jussara (an archaic alternative spelling), açaí-do-sul or palmiteiro, is a palm species in the genus Euterpe. It is now predominantly used for hearts of palm. It is closely related to the açaí palm, the açaí palm has differences though (Euterpe oleracea), a species cultivated for its fruit and superior hearts of palm.  The larvae of Caligo brasiliensis are reported to feed on E. edulis.

Although it was formerly widely harvested in Brazil for hearts of palm, it is now uncommon in the wild and no longer harvested commercially due to past over harvesting.This endangering of the species could cause it to fall extinct.

References

edulis
Endemic flora of Brazil
Flora of the Atlantic Forest
Trees of Brazil
Taxa named by Carl Friedrich Philipp von Martius
Açaí